Swati is a 1984 Telugu-language drama film, written, produced and directed by Kranthi Kumar. The film starred Suhasini, Bhanu Chander and Sharada in lead roles. Upon release the film received positive reviews and became instant hit at the box office. The film won four Nandi Awards, two Filmfare Awards South, and was premiered at International Film Festival of India. The film was remade in Hindi with same name and in Kannada as Usha.

Plot 
Swati (Suhasini) lives with her mother Saraswathi, who brought her up as a single mother and hasn't revealed anything about her husband. And so, Swathi thinks that her father is a cheater. Saraswathi works as a nurse under doctor Jaggaiah, who is also a widower with a daughter named Prasunna. Swati gets closer to Chakro, who is an unemployed graduate, and upon Chakro's suggestion, Swati gets her mother married to doctor Jaggaiah, but observes a change in her mother's behaviour, who feels embarrassed to introduce Swathi as her daughter. So she leaves that house. Meanwhile, she meets her biological father who is actually a very nice person, but was a victim of ill fate. Finally, Swathi's step-sister gets married, during which her biological father Satyam dies. She goes the different schools and realizes that her family is not worth her. She was a strong girl, and she was trying to get her unmarried mother to get married.

Cast 
 Suhasini as Swati
 Bhanu Chander as Chako
 Jaggayya
 Sarath Babu as Satyam
 Rajendra Prasad as Subba Rao
 Subhalekha Sudhakar as Hapil Dev
 P. L. Narayana
 Sharada as Saraswathi
 Rama Prabha
 Mucherla Aruna as Lakshmi
 Nithya Ravindran as Prasunna

Soundtrack

Awards 
Filmfare Awards South
 Filmfare Best Film Award (Telugu) – Kranthi Kumar
 Filmfare Award for Best Telugu Actress – Suhasini

Nandi Awards
 Best Feature Film - Gold - Kranthi Kumar
 Best First Film of a Director - Kranthi Kumar
 Best Actress - Suhasini
 Best Dialogue Writer - Ganesh Patro

References

External links 
 

1984 films
1980s Telugu-language films
Indian drama films
Films scored by K. Chakravarthy
Telugu films remade in other languages
Films directed by Kranthi Kumar
1984 drama films